Mautner's lemma in representation theory, named after Austrian-American mathematician Friederich Mautner, states that if G is a topological group and π a unitary representation of G on a Hilbert space H, then for any x in G, which has conjugates 

yxy−1

converging to the identity element e, for a net of elements y, then any vector v of H invariant under all the π(y) is also invariant under π(x).

References
F. Mautner, Geodesic flows on symmetric Riemannian spaces (1957),  Ann. Math. 65, 416-430

Unitary representation theory
Topological groups
Theorems in representation theory
Lemmas in group theory